Sir John Auld Mactaggart, 4th Baronet (born 21 January 1951) is a Scottish entrepreneur and philanthropist.

Mactaggart was educated at Shrewsbury School and Trinity College, Cambridge.

He was Chairman of Central Holdings 1981–1992, Chairman of Western Heritable Investment Co. since 1987, Chairman of Bruichladdich Distillery Company 2004–2012, Chairman of Waterford Distillery Company since 2014 and Renegade Spirits Grenada since 2016. Mactaggart has been involved in a number of charitable organizations, including Thames Valley Housing Association, The Head Injuries Trust for Scotland, Defeating Deafness, Action on Hearing Loss, The Scottish Ballet, Commonweal Housing and Grove End Housing Association amongst others.

He married firstly, in 1977, Patricia, youngest daughter of Major Harry Alastair Gordon, M.C. and Lady Joan Patricia Quirk, daughter of Field Marshal Archibald Wavell, 1st Earl Wavell. They divorced in 1990. In 1991, he married Caroline, youngest daughter of Eric Charles Williams, of Fair Acre, Esher, Surrey; they had two sons and two daughters. He married thirdly Helena van der Kun.

Sir John is the older brother of the Right Honourable Fiona Mactaggart, Labour Party MP for Slough from 1997 to 2017.

References

1960 births
Living people
Scottish businesspeople
People educated at Shrewsbury School
Alumni of Trinity College, Cambridge
Place of birth missing (living people)
Baronets in the Baronetage of the United Kingdom